Chungakkarum Veshyakalum is a Canadian-Indian film in Malayalam language. It was written, directed, co-produced and co-edited by Isaac Thomas. The film stars Thilakan in the lead role, Sanjay George and Anu Thahim in supporting roles.

The film started production on 30 October 2007. It was released in Kerala in August 2011.

Plot
Chungakkarum Veshyakalum is the story of a Malayali family who emigrated to Canada some years back. Later Unnunnichayan (Thilakan) goes to Canada to stay with his son. He is from a village in Kerala and  finds it difficult to adjust with the Canadian lifestyle. He faced difficulties since he does not know English or the Canadian people. On occasions, even his son got angry with him for his mistakes or ignorant behaviour.

Cast

References

External links
 OneIndia article

Canadian drama films
Indian drama films
2010s Malayalam-language films
2011 films
Films about Indian Canadians
2010s Canadian films